Asparagus lignosus  ("Katdoring") is a thorny, spindly creeper of the Asparagus genus, that is indigenous to the Western Cape Province of South Africa.

Description
A rigid, upright shrub reaching 80 cm in height. The branches are zig-zagged, and pale grey-green to white.

At each node along the branch, there is a single recurved 5mm thorn.

The stiff, linear (length 10-20mm), cylindrical, spine-tipped leaves are in tufts.

The flowers are white with a green strip on each tepal. The anthers are orange. They appear singly or in pairs.

Related species 
This species is part of a group of closely related African Asparagus species, including Asparagus rubicundus, Asparagus concinnus and Asparagus microraphis.

Distribution
This species is indigenous to the Western Cape Province, South Africa.

Its distribution is from Clanwilliam in the far north-west and Cape Town in the west, eastwards across the Little Karoo and Overberg regions, as far as Mossel Bay in the south-east.

It occurs in rocky sandstone slopes, as well as rocky loamy soils in fynbos or renosterveld vegetation on lower slopes and flats.

References

Further reading
 

lignosus
Flora of the Cape Provinces
Creepers of South Africa
Renosterveld
Taxa named by Nicolaas Laurens Burman